Ballathie House is a 19th-century mansion in Perthshire, Scotland. The present house was built in 1886, and since 1972 it has operated as a country house hotel.

History

Before 1886
The Drummond family, the Earls of Perth, owned the Ballathie lands in the 17th century, selling to the Robertson family. According to Historic Environment Scotland, the house was built during the 1850s. General Richardson Robertson of Tullybelton undertook the building of the current house but died in 1883, 3 years before it was completed.

Country house, 1886-1972

General Richardson Robertson's nephew, Colonel Edmund Robert Stewart Richardson took over the house, selling it in 1910 to Sir Stewart Coats, from Paisley. The house was enlarged by alterations to the servants quarters and a new entrance porch. Central heating and electric lighting were also installed. An army hut was erected for use as a dance hall after the World War I and dances were held for staff and locals. A 9-hole golf course was laid out by professional golfer Ben Sayers but this was ploughed up as part of the campaign to provide more food during World War II.

Ballathie's fame as a sporting estate led to many famous guests coming to stay during this period. These included:

Duke Michael of Russia and his wife, Natalia, Princess Brassova
John Wolfe-Barry, civil engineer whose most famous projects included Tower Bridge and the District Line in London
Arthur Winnington-Ingram, Bishop of London from 1901 to 1939
The Prince of Wales, later King Edward VIII
Hugh Grosvenor, 2nd Duke of Westminster

In 1936, the estate was sold to Colonel Stephen Hardie, a chartered accountant in Glasgow and founder member of the British Oxygen Company. Hardie died in 1969 and the house was sold, and converted into a hotel in 1972 by Colonel & Mrs Brassey & Maxwell family from the west of Scotland.

Hotel, since 1972
John Milligan purchased the estate separately in 1998, then also the hotel in 2005. The estate is still used for farming and sports. The Sportsman's Lodge was completed in 2003, within the grounds of the hotel.

Hotel facilities
Ballathie has 23 bedrooms in the main hotel, plus 11 more at the Sportsman's Lodge. It is a venue for wedding ceremonies and receptions and also has rooms for conferences and meetings up to a capacity of 50. The hotel is on the River Tay, a salmon fishing river. Clay pigeon and grouse shooting are available.

Awards
 VisitScotland, the Scottish tourist board, rates Ballathie as a 4 star hotel.
 The hotel's restaurant received the Silver Award from EatScotland, the restaurant guide of VisitScotland.
 The AA gives the hotel 4 stars and 2 red rosettes.
 Rural Restaurant Award win at the Scottish Hotel Awards 2010.

External links
 Ballathie House Hotel official website

References

Hotels in Perth and Kinross
Category B listed buildings in Perth and Kinross
Hotels established in 1972
Country houses in Perth and Kinross